In chemistry, the cyclooctatetraenide anion or cyclooctatetraenide, more precisely cyclooctatetraenediide, is an aromatic species with a formula of [C8H8]2− and abbreviated as COT2−. It is the dianion of cyclooctatetraene. Salts of the cyclooctatetraenide anion can be stable, e.g., Dipotassium cyclooctatetraenide or disodium cyclooctatetraenide. More complex coordination compounds are known as cyclooctatetraenide complexes, such as the actinocenes.

The structure is a planar symmetric octagon stabilized by resonance, meaning each atom bears a charge of −. The length of the bond between carbon atoms is 1.432 Å. There are 10 π electrons. The structure can serve as a ligand with various metals.

List of salts

See also
Tropylium ion
Cyclopentadienyl anion

References

Simple aromatic rings
Anions
Non-benzenoid aromatic carbocycles